

Past stations 
These stations have re-entered the atmosphere and disintegrated.

The Soviet Union ran two programs simultaneously in the 1970s, both of which were called Salyut publicly.  The Long Duration Orbital Station (DOS) program was intended for scientific research into spaceflight.  The Almaz program was a secret military program that tested space reconnaissance.

         = Never crewed

Prototypes 
These stations are prototypes; they only exist as testing platforms and were never intended to be crewed. OPS 0855 was part of a cancelled Manned Orbiting Laboratory project by the United States, while the Genesis stations were launched privately. The Genesis stations were "retired" when their avionics systems stopped working after two and a half years, yet they still remain in orbit as derelict spacecraft.

Operational stations 

Planned and proposed 
These space stations have been announced by their host entity and are currently in planning, development or production.  The launch date listed here may change as more information becomes available.

Cancelled projects 

Most of these stations were canceled due to financial difficulties, or merged into other projects.

Timeline

Size comparison

See also 

 Spacelab
 List of crewed spacecraft
 Commercial Space Stations
 Space stations and habitats in fiction

Notes

References

External links 
 

Spaceflight timelines